The 2020 European Canoe Slalom Championships took place in Prague, Czech Republic from 18 to 20 September 2020. Originally they were scheduled to take place in London, England, from 15 to 17 May 2020. However, on 18 March, the European Canoe Association announced that the event had been cancelled, due to the COVID-19 pandemic. Later on it was announced that the event would be held in Prague instead of one of the rounds of the World Cup series.

It was the 21st edition of the competition, and took place at the Prague-Troja Canoeing Centre.

Several leading countries (including Germany, Great Britain and Slovakia) decided not to participate in the event due to COVID related concerns.

Medal summary

Men

Canoe

Kayak

Women

Canoe

Kayak

Medals Table

See also

Impact of the COVID-19 pandemic on sports

References

External links
 European Canoe Association

European Canoe Slalom Championships
European Canoe Slalom Championships
European Canoe Slalom Championships
European Canoe Slalom Championships
European Canoe Slalom Championships